Yeşilova is a village in Akdeniz district of Mersin Province, Turkey (the Akdeniz district center is a part of Greater Mersin). It is a village in Çukurova (Cilicia) plains. The population of the village was 248 as of 2012. The village produces fruits and vegetables, especially grapes.

References

Villages in Akdeniz District